Sarrak-e Sofla (also Romanized as Sarrāk-e Soflá; also known as Sarrāk-e Pā‘īn) is a village in Howmeh-ye Sharqi Rural District, in the Central District of Izeh County, Khuzestan Province, Iran. At the 2006 census, its population was 808, in 136 families.

References 

Populated places in Izeh County